Promotional merchandise are products branded with a logo or slogan and distributed at little or no cost to promote a brand, corporate identity, or event. Such products, which are often informally called promo products, swag (mass nouns), tchotchkes, or freebies (count nouns), are used in marketing and sales. They are given away or sold at a loss to promote a company, corporate image, brand, or event. They are often distributed as handouts at trade shows, at conferences, on sales calls (that is, visits to companies that are purchasing or might purchase), and as bonus items in shipped orders. They are often used in guerrilla marketing campaigns.

History
The first known promotional products in the United States were commemorative buttons dating back to the election of George Washington in 1789.  During the early 19th century, there were some advertising calendars, rulers, and wooden specialties, but there was no organized industry for the creation and distribution of promotional items until later in the 19th century.

Jasper Meek, a printer in Coshocton, Ohio, is considered by many to be the originator of the industry when he convinced a local shoe store to supply book bags imprinted with the store name to local schools. Henry Beach, another Coshocton printer and a competitor of Meek, picked up on the idea, and soon the two men were selling and printing marble bags, buggy whips, card cases, fans, calendars, cloth caps, aprons, and even hats for horses.

In 1904, 12 manufacturers of promotional items got together to found the first trade association for the industry. That organization is now known as the Promotional Products Association International or PPAI, which currently has more than 10,000 global members. PPAI represents the promotional products industry of more than 22,000 distributors and approximately 4,800 manufacturers.

The UK and Ireland promotional merchandise industry formally emerged as corporate marketing became more sophisticated during the late 1950s. Before this, companies may have provided occasional gifts, but there was no recognised promotional merchandise industry. The real explosion in the growth of the promotional merchandise industry took place in the 1970s. At this time an ever-increasing number of corporate companies recognised the benefits gained from promoting their corporate identity, brand or product, with the use of gifts featuring their own logo. In the early years, the range of products available were limited; however, in the early 1980s demand grew from distributors for a generic promotional product catalogue they could brand as their own and then leave with to their corporate customers.

In later years these catalogues could be over-branded to reflect a distributor's corporate image; distributors could then give them to their end user customers as their own. In the early years, promotional merchandise catalogues were very much sales tools and customers would buy the products offered on the pages.

In the 1990s, new catalogue services emerged for distributors from various sources. The nineties also saw the emergence of ‘Catalogue Groups’ - groups who offered a unique catalogue to a limited geographical group of promotional merchandise distributor companies. Membership of a Catalogue Group could also offer improved buying terms, a network of fellow distributor companies, and provide other support services. Examples of Catalogue Groups include Trade Only Spectrum Catalogue, Page Group and the Envoy Group, offering discounted products to a select group of distributors who have all been in the industry for over three years. Members of the Envoy Group have regional exclusivity as one of their perks providing some protection to the low entry barrier of the market

Up until the 1990s, the industry had a peak season in which the majority of promotional products were sold. The season featured around Christmas and the giving of gifts. This changed significantly in the early 1990s as Christmas gifts became less appropriate in a multicultural society. Companies were also becoming more inventive in their marketing and were now using promotional merchandise throughout the year to support the promotion of brands, products & events. In the early 21st century the role of a promotional merchandise catalogue started to change, as it could no longer fully represent the vast range of products in the market place. By 2007, catalogues were being mailed to targeted customer lists, rather than the blanket postal mailings that had taken place before. The catalogue had now become seen more as a ‘business card’ demonstrating the concept of what a company did, rather than a critical sales tool. In 2009 published results from research involving a representative group of distributor companies, which indicated the usage of hard copy catalogues was expected to fall up to 25% in 2010.

Distributor companies are experts in sourcing creative promotional products. Traditionally, to ensure that they had an effective manufacturer network, they kept themselves aware of the trade product ranges available from mailings received from manufacturers themselves and by attending trade exhibitions across the world, for example the Trade Only National Show in the UK, the Promotional Product Service Institute (PSI) show in Europe and the Promotional Products Association International (PPAI) Show in Las Vegas, NV.

In 2004, the way the trade sourced promotional products began to change with the launch an online trade sourcing service, which united distributors with manufacturers worldwide. This service is purely for vetted trade promotional merchandise distributor companies and is not available to corporate end user companies.

By 2008 almost every distributor had a website demonstrating a range of available promotional products. Very few offer the ability to order products online mainly due to the complexities surrounding the processes to brand the promotional products required.

Sourcing
In the United States, Canada, the UK, Ireland, Australia and NZ, companies, and corporations mainly purchase their merchandise through promotional merchandise distributor companies. These distributors are called "Promotional Consultants" or "promotional product distributors".

Promotional products by definition are custom printed with a logo, company name, or message usually in specific PMS colors. Distributors help end-users gather artwork in the correct format, and in some cases also create artwork for end-users. Distributors then send the artwork to the manufacturers, printers, or suppliers along with instructions on where and how to print the logo.

Many distributors operate on the internet and/or in person. Many suppliers wish not to invest in the staffing to service end-users' needs, which is the purpose of merchandise distributor companies.

Products and uses

Promotional merchandise is used globally to promote brands, products, and corporate identity. They are also used as giveaways at events, such as exhibitions and product launches. Promotional products can be used for non-profit organizations to promote their cause, as well as promote certain events that they hold, such as walks or any other event that raises money for a cause.

Almost anything can be branded with a company's name or logo and used for promotion. Common items include t-shirts, caps, keychains, posters, bumper stickers, pens, mugs, koozies, toys or mouse pads. The largest product category for promotional products is wearable items, which make up more than 30% of the total.  Eco-friendly promotional products such as those created from recycled materials and renewable resources have been experiencing a significant surge in popularity.

Most promotional items are relatively small and inexpensive, but can range to higher-end items; for example celebrities at film festivals and award shows are often given expensive promotional items such as expensive perfumes, leather goods, and electronics items. Companies that provide expensive gifts for celebrity attendees often ask that the celebrities allow a photo to be taken of them with the gift item, which can be used by the company for promotional purposes. Other companies provide luxury gifts such as handbags or scarves to celebrity attendees in the hopes that the celebrities will wear these items in public, thus garnering publicity for the company's brand name and product.

Brand awareness is the most common use for promotional items. Other objectives that marketers use promotional items to facilitate include employee relations and events, tradeshow traffic-building, public relations, new customer generation, dealer and distributor programs, new product introductions, employee service awards, not-for-profit programs, internal incentive programs, safety education, customer referrals, and marketing research.

Promotional items are also used in politics to promote candidates and causes. Promotional items as a tool for non-commercial organizations, such as schools and charities are often used as a part of fund raising and awareness-raising campaigns. A prominent example was the livestrong wristband, used to promote cancer awareness and raise funds to support cancer survivorship programs and research.

Using promotional merchandise in Guerrilla Marketing involves branding in such a way as to create a specific visual effect, attracting more attention.

The giving of corporate gifts vary across international borders and cultures, with the type of product given often varying from country to country.

Promotional merchandise is rarely bought directly by corporate companies from the actual manufacturers of promotional products. A manufacturer's expertise lies in the physical production of the products, but getting a product in front of potential customers is a completely different skill set and a complex process. Within the UK & Ireland, the promotional merchandise industry a comprehensive network of promotional merchandise distributor companies exist. A promotional merchandise distributor is defined as a company who "has a dedicated focus to the sale of promotional merchandise to end-users". (An 'end-user' is a corporate company or organization that purchases promotional merchandise for their own use.) These distributor companies have the expertise to not only take the product to market but are also to provide the expert support required. The unique aspect of promotional merchandise is that on most occasions the product is printed with the logo, or brand, of a corporate organization. The actual manufacturers rarely have the set up to actually print the item. Promotional merchandise distributor companies are experts in artwork and printing processes. In addition to this, the promotional merchandise distributors also provide full support in processing orders, artwork, proofing, progress chasing & delivery of promotional products from multiple manufacturing sources.

Trade associations
In the UK, the industry has two main trade bodies, Promota (Promotional Merchandise Trade Association) founded in 1958, and the BPMA (British Promotional Merchandise Association) established in 1965. These trade associations represent the industry and provide services to both manufacturers & distributors of promotional merchandise. The BPMA provides a range of services including market research into the UK promotional merchandise industry. Since 2010 the BPMA has partnered with Trade Only, A UK company that organizes the primary UK Trade Show for the Promotional Product Industry, this takes place at the Ricoh Arena in Coventry usually the third week of January. The BPMA host an awards dinner and banquet on the middle night of the exhibition which is called the Trade Only National Show

In the United States, PPAI (the Promotional Products Association International) is the not for profit association, offering the industry's largest tradeshow (The PPAI Expo), as well as training, online member resources, and legal advocacy. Another organization, the Advertising Specialty Institute, promotes itself as the largest media and marketing organization serving the advertising specialty industry.

In Europe, the existing EPPA will be replaced by a new organization setup by the key countries welcoming all other countries to join. The new umbrella organization will be called EPMO or PME (Product Media Europe).

UK market statistics
According to research completed and published in 2008 the UK and Ireland promotional merchandise industry had an overall value of £850m. By mid-2009 the market had decreased to £712m as the UK's worst-ever recession took a grip. In July 2009 published research demonstrated that the top 10 promotional merchandise products were promotional pens, bags, clothing, plastic items, USB memory sticks, mugs, leather items, polyurethane conference folders, and umbrellas. The July research from a representation industry focus group also found that the current fastest-growing product was hand sanitiser, which at the time coincided with the outbreak & growth of swine flu in the UK.

US market statistics

Sales of the US promotional products industry totaled $24 billion in 2017 and growing at a rate of 2.5 percent since 2012, according to statistics released by IBISWorld. There are 26,413 business in this category and they employ 392,820 people across the United States.

The most common promotional items include T-shirts (25% of the market), writing instruments, tech accessories, bags, keychains, brochures, bookmarks and notepads.

Australian and New Zealand market statistics
The Australasian Promotional Products Association (APPA) has conducted research to show the value of the promotional merchandise industry in Australia and New Zealand. According to APPA the industry has a turnover of AUD$1340m in Australia and NZ$144m in New Zealand  APPA states the effectiveness of promotional merchandise is demonstrated by their research which shows that 52% of recipients of promotional merchandise say their impression of a company is more positive after receiving a promotional product, 76% recall the name advertised on the product, 55% keep the item for more than one year, nearly 50% of recipients use them daily and 52% of people do business with a company after receiving a promotional product. 
Other considerations and benefits of promotional merchandise include product definition, residual value marketing, accountability, "The Power of Purpose", product types, such as printing and artwork.

See also
 Promotion (marketing)
 Loyalty marketing
 Loss leader
 Showbag

References

Advertising techniques
Merchandise
Sales promotion